The IPSC Australian Handgun Championship is an IPSC level 3 championship held once a year by IPSC Australia.

Champions 
The following is a list of current and previous champions.

Overall category

Lady category

Junior category

Senior category

Super Senior category

See also 
IPSC Australian Rifle Championship
IPSC Australian Shotgun Championship

References 

Match Results - 2003 IPSC Australian Handgun Championship
Match Results - 2004 IPSC Australian Handgun Championship
Match Results - 2005 IPSC Australian Handgun Championship
Match Results - 2006 IPSC Australian Handgun Championship
Match Results - 2007 IPSC Australian Handgun Championship
Match Results - 2008 IPSC Australian Handgun Championship
Match Results - 2010 IPSC Australian Handgun Championship
Match Results - 2011 IPSC Australian Handgun Championship
Match Results - 2012 IPSC Australian Handgun Championship
Match Results - 2014 IPSC Australian Handgun Championship
Match Results - 2016 IPSC Australian Handgun Championship

IPSC shooting competitions
National championships in Australia
Shooting competitions in Australia